Matheuzinho is a nick name. It may refer to:

 Matheuzinho (footballer, born 1993), Matheus Cotulio Bossa, Brazilian football attacking midfielder
 Matheuzinho (footballer, born 2000), Matheus França Silva, Brazilian football right-back

See also
 Matheusinho (born 1998), Matheus Leonardo Sales Cardoso, Brazilian football attacking midfielder